Robert Goix (7 January 1906 – 15 July 1983) was a French middle-distance runner. He competed in the men's 1500 metres at the 1936 Summer Olympics.

References

1906 births
1983 deaths
Athletes (track and field) at the 1936 Summer Olympics
French male middle-distance runners
Olympic athletes of France
Place of birth missing
20th-century French people